Joseph Anthony Somers-Morales (born September 11, 1987), better known by his stage name SoMo, is an American singer and songwriter.

Career
In 2009, SoMo started recording covers in Denton, Texas. A successful 2011 mash-up of Drake's Take Care led a massive draw to his YouTube channel, which has garnered 300M+ views on the platform. Throughout 2012, SoMo began to work on original music. His efforts in the studio yielded the independent debut mixtape My Life, merging R&B spirit with pop soul and showcasing his voice and songwriting. The mixtape was released for free on his birthday, September 11, 2013. Simultaneously, he released a new cover video every Sunday as part of his "SoMo Sunday" campaign.

Struck by the success of SoMo's independent national tour, Republic Records partnered with him in October 2013. Following the re-release of his single "Ride" in November 2013, the song peaked at #76 on the Billboard Hot 100. On February 12, 2014, SoMo announced the release date of his self-titled debut album, "SoMo", set for April 8, 2014.

On September 11, 2015, his 28th birthday, SoMo released My Life II, a sequel to his mixtape My Life.

Prior to his second studio album, SoMo released the singles "Control" on May 1, 2016, "First" on August 5, 2016, and "Play" featuring Maty Noyes on January 27, 2017.

On February 10, 2017, SoMo announced that his second album would be titled The Answers, and would be released on March 17, 2017. The album was made available to pre-order that same day, with a new song titled "Just a Man". The second promotional single, "Champion", was released on March 3, 2017. The album's third and final promotional single, "Want It", was released on March 10, 2017.

On September 11, 2017, his 30th birthday, SoMo released My Life III, which he describes as the beginning of a new SoMo era. This mixtape was released independently  via the SoMo, LLC imprint and continues to be bolstered by the ongoing success of the lead single, "For You".

On Christmas Day 2017, SoMo released a new single titled "50 Feet", and another single, "Wake up Call", was released a week later on New Year's Day 2018.

On February 12, 2018, SoMo released a new single called "Nov 12", prior to embarking on The Reservations Tour, a headlining run across the US.

On August 6, 2018, SoMo released "I'm Comin' Home" as the lead single from his upcoming third studio album, A Beautiful November. He will embark on the tour of the same name beginning in the fall.

On September 24, 2018, SoMo released a single titled "Better Me".

On October 15, 2018, SoMo released another single titled "All the Time", which he describes as the most personal song he's written.

A week later, on 22 October 2018, SoMo released a single titled "Weight".

On 5 November 2018, SoMo released "Roses" as a single.

On 19 November 2018, SoMo released a single titled "I Wish".

On 30 November 2018, SoMo released his third studio album, A Beautiful November.

On February 14, 2019, SoMo released a single titled "Wild Heart".

On April 1, 2019, SoMo released a new single titled "Neck".

On July 1, 2019, SoMo released a new single titled "Visualize".

On December 16, 2019, SoMo released a new holiday single titled "Maybe".

Following the singles "Sinkin' Down", "Mi Amor", "Dime", "Brian K. Lundy, Jr.", and "All That", SoMo announced that his fourth studio album, I Had Another Dream, would be released on October 19, 2020. The final tracklist revealed that all of the past released singles, excluding "Maybe" and "Brian K. Lundy, Jr.", would be included on the album, along with 3 new songs.

On November 30, 2020, SoMo released a single titled "Trees".

On January 25, 2021, SoMo released a new single titled "Blue Rose".

On February 15, 2021, SoMo released a new single titled "Boom".

On March 29, 2021, SoMo released a new single titled "Dolly Parton".

On April 26, 2021, SoMo released a song titled "Rain". The song features guest vocals from SoMo's daughter, Finley Grace. SoMo said the song is his favorite one he's ever made. He also announced the title of his upcoming fifth studio album as The Duality of Man.

On June 13, 2022 SoMo released a song titled "Overflow".

On July 11, 2022 SoMo released a song titled "Petals"

Discography

 SoMo (2014)
 The Answers (2017)
 A Beautiful November (2018)
 I Had Another Dream (2020)
 The Duality of Man (2021)

References

External links

Living people
1987 births
21st-century American singers
American male singer-songwriters
American contemporary R&B singers
American male pop singers
Singer-songwriters from Texas
People from Denison, Texas
People from Austin, Texas
Hispanic and Latino American musicians
21st-century American male singers